Kim Min-ji (born August 16, 1999) is a South Korean curler. She currently plays third on the Gyeonggi Province curling team skipped by Gim Eun-ji. She is a 2018 Pacific-Asia Curling champion.

Career
Kim skipped the South Korean junior team at the 2016 World Junior Curling Championships. She led her team of Kim Hye-rin, Yang Tae-i, Oh Su-yun and Lee Ji-young to a bronze medal finish. After finishing the round robin with a 7–2 record, the team lost to Hungary (skipped by Dorottya Palancsa) in the 3 vs. 4 page playoff game, but went on to beat the Hungarians in a re-match in the bronze medal game, after Hungary lost in the semifinal.

Kim began skipping a team on the World Curling Tour in 2016. She won her first tour event by claiming the 2016 Hub International Crown of Curling.

Kim, and teammates Kim Hye-rin, Yang and Kim Su-jin represented Korea at the 2017 World Junior Curling Championships. The team posted a 5–4 round robin record, tied with Switzerland for fourth. They would beat the Swiss in a tiebreaker, before losing two straight games against Canada to finish in fourth place. This same team represented Korea at the 2018 World Junior Curling Championships. There, Kim led the team to a 4–5 record, missing the playoffs.

Kim began the 2018–19 season by winning the Hokkaido Bank Curling Classic. Then she and her team won gold on 2018 Pacific-Asia Curling Championships, earning South Korea a berth into the 2019 World Women's Curling Championship.

She and her team participated in all four legs of the 2018–19 Curling World Cup. In the First Leg, they finished with a 1–5 record, placing seventh out of eight teams. At the Second Leg, she and her team made it all the way to the final falling just short to Japan's Satsuki Fujisawa 7–6. Her team improved on this performance by winning the Third Leg against Sweden's Anna Hasselborg rink. In the Grand Final, the team finished with a 2–4 record.

Her team, still junior eligible represented Korea at the 2019 World Junior Curling Championships. They finished the round robin with a 6–3 record, which was tied with three other teams for the second best record. However, they missed the playoffs due to tiebreaker rules. The following month, the team represented Korea at the 2019 Winter Universiade. This time their 6–3 record was enough to make the playoffs, where they made it all the way to the final before losing to Sweden. Later that month, the team had yet another international event to play in, the 2019 World Championship. The team was even better on this stage, finishing the round robin with a 9–3 record, in second place. In the playoffs, they lost to Switzerland's Silvana Tirinzoni rink in the semifinal, but rebounded to win the bronze medal game against Seina Nakajima of Japan. It was the first ever medal won by Korea at the Women's World Championship. The team ended their season with a 1–3 record at the 2019 Champions Cup Grand Slam of Curling event.

Team Kim lost the final of the 2019 Korean Women's Curling Championship the following season in June 2019 to the Gim Un-chi rink after Kim missed her last shot and gave up a steal of two in the tenth end. This meant they would not be the national women's team for the season. The team won the Tour Challenge Tier 2 event after a strong 9–2 win over Jestyn Murphy. This qualified them for the Canadian Open in Yorkton, Saskatchewan. There, they defeated higher ranked teams such as three time Scotties champion Rachel Homan, 2013 world champion Eve Muirhead and 2020 Scotties champion Kerri Einarson. They made it all the way to the final before losing to the Anna Hasselborg rink in an extra end. They also made it all the way to the final of the 2020 World Junior Curling Championships, where they lost to Canada's Mackenzie Zacharias. On the World Curling Tour, they won the Boundary Ford Curling Classic, finished fourth at the inaugural WCT Uiseong International Curling Cup, made the quarterfinals at the Red Deer Curling Classic and missed the playoffs at the 2019 Curlers Corner Autumn Gold Curling Classic and the 2019 Canad Inns Women's Classic.

Kim and her rink began the abbreviated 2020–21 season at the 2020 Korean National Women's Curling Championship. There, they qualified for the playoffs with a 5–1 record before losing both of their playoff games to the Kim Eun-jung and Gim Un-chi rinks, settling for third. Later that season, Team Kim competed in the only two Grand Slam events of the season, which were played in a "curling bubble" in Calgary, Alberta, with no spectators, to avoid the spread of the coronavirus. The team missed the playoffs at both the 2021 Champions Cup and the 2021 Players' Championship.

The 2021–22 season began in June for Team Kim as they competed in the 2021 Korean Curling Championships to decide who would get the chance to represent Korea at the 2022 Winter Olympics in Beijing, China. In the first of three rounds, the team went a perfect 4–0 in the round robin before losing in the semifinal to the Gim Un-chi rink. They rebounded with a win over Kim Ji-su in the third place game. In the second round, they went 4–2, however, because Team Kim Eun-jung won both the first and second rounds, they became the national champions. Kim later competed in the 2021 Korean Mixed Doubles Curling Championship with partner Lee Ki-jeong. The pair qualified through the Gangwon qualifier with a perfect 5–0 record. They then won twelve straight matches to claim the national mixed doubles title. Because of this, Kim was absent from her women's team for the rest of the season. In October, Kim and Lee captured the WCT Heracles Mixed Doubles Slovakia Cup on the World Curling Tour. At the 2021 Olympic Qualification Event, the pair lost in the qualification final to Australia's Tahli Gill and Dean Hewitt, meaning they would not compete in the Olympic Games. Kim and Lee again represented Korea at the 2022 World Mixed Doubles Curling Championship where they finished in fifteenth with a 4–5 record. In March 2022, Kim Min-ji moved to Gyeonggi Province to join Team Gim Eun-ji. The team competed in two Grand Slams at the end of the year, the 2022 Players' Championship and the 2022 Champions Cup. After missing the playoffs at the Players', the team made it all the way to the final of the Champions Cup where they lost to Kerri Einarson.

Grand Slam record

References

External links

Living people
South Korean female curlers
Pacific-Asian curling champions
1999 births
Sportspeople from Gyeonggi Province
Universiade medalists in curling
Universiade silver medalists for South Korea
Competitors at the 2019 Winter Universiade
21st-century South Korean women